Willer Souza Oliveira (born 18 November 1979) or simply Willer, is a Brazilian former professional football player.

Career 
Willer Souza Oliveira began his career in Brazil with Itapipoca Esporte Clube before moving to Argentinian club Independiente in 2001.

Eastern Europe
Following a transfer to Russia with FC Anzhi Makhachkala (36 matches, 2 goals) in 2002. he subsequently signed for FC Dynamo Bryansk (42 matches, 8 goals) in 2004–2005, enjoying popularity from supporters for his flamboyant approach and acrobatic goalscoring celebrations. This success earned Willer a move to Russian Far East side Luch-Energia Vladivostok in 2005 - promoted team to First Division, and he did a considerable impact in a Russian Cup match against FC Rostov. In the summer of 2006, he went on loan to FC Oryol until the end of the year (22 matches, 7 goals).

In April 2007 Willer completed his move to Lithuanian outfit FK Sūduva,. scoring 10 goals in 30 matches, as Suduva finished second behind FBK Kaunas. Willer also played UEFA Cup for Sūduva, creating a goal against Northern Ireland's Dungannon Swifts in August 2007 (Qualify round - won 4x0). In 2008, Willer joined FC Smorgon in Belarus where he played until December (12 matches, 3 goals).

Alianza
In 2009, he moved to Fortaleza Esporte Clube to play Campeonato Brasileiro Serie B (second division). In 2010, Willer joined first division club Alianza of El Salvador. He was considered the best foreign soccer player in the Apertura 2010 and He did 5 goals and 7 assistances in 20 matches. He was the number 10 and appeared in all games. Alianza went to final after 6 years but lost on penalties (3 x 4 Metapan). He moved to Horizonte in 2011 to play Brazil Cup and State Cup of Ceará Province. He moved to Wigry Suwałki on 30 June 2011.

He returned to Alianza before the 2012 Clausura.

Istiqlol Dushanbe
In January 2013, Willer signed a contract with Tajik League side Istiqlol Dushanbe, joining them in March of the same year. Willer went on to be named 'Best Player' for May 2013 by Tajikistan Football Federation.

Halcones Return
In June 2014, Willer returned to Halcones FC.

Career statistics

Honors
Istiklol
 Tajik Cup (1): 2013
 Tajik Super Cup (1): 2014

References

External links
 Where's Willer? A Brazilian in the East
  El Grafico Profile
  Willer's interview
  90minut Profile
 

1979 births
Living people
Brazilian footballers
Brazilian expatriate footballers
Expatriate footballers in Russia
Expatriate footballers in Lithuania
Expatriate footballers in Belarus
Expatriate footballers in El Salvador
Expatriate footballers in Poland
Expatriate footballers in Guatemala
Expatriate footballers in Tajikistan
Russian Premier League players
FC Anzhi Makhachkala players
FC Dynamo Bryansk players
FC Luch Vladivostok players
FC Oryol players
FK Sūduva Marijampolė players
FC Smorgon players
Fortaleza Esporte Clube players
Ferroviário Atlético Clube (CE) players
Alianza F.C. footballers
Wigry Suwałki players
FC Istiklol players
Association football midfielders
Tajikistan Higher League players
Horizonte Futebol Clube players